Judit Fekete (born 2 July 1944) is a Hungarian volleyball player. She competed in the women's tournament at the 1972 Summer Olympics.

References

1944 births
Living people
Hungarian women's volleyball players
Olympic volleyball players of Hungary
Volleyball players at the 1972 Summer Olympics
Volleyball players from Budapest